Karl-Dietrich Diers (born 9 May 1953) is a German former cyclist. He competed for  East Germany in the individual road race and team time trial events at the 1976 Summer Olympics.

References

External links
 

1953 births
Living people
Sportspeople from Halle (Saale)
People from Bezirk Halle
East German male cyclists
Olympic cyclists of East Germany
Cyclists at the 1976 Summer Olympics
Cyclists from Saxony-Anhalt